Tchongorove Airport  is an airstrip serving Iguéla, a sport fishing center in Ogooué-Maritime Province, Gabon. The runway is on a narrow peninsula on the ocean side of the Iguéla Lagoon

See also

 List of airports in Gabon
 Transport in Gabon

References

External links
The Margouilla - Iguéla
HERE/Nokia - Tchongorove
OurAirports - Tchongorove

Airports in Gabon